Murph the Surf, also known as Live a Little, Steal a Lot, is a 1975 film based on a jewel burglary involving the surfer Jack Roland Murphy, who had the nickname "Murph the Surf". Starring Robert Conrad and Don Stroud, it was directed by Marvin J. Chomsky. The New York Times edition of October 20, 2019 revisited the true story of Jack Murphy's theft of the irreplaceable gemstones from a poorly guarded Museum of Natural History.

Plot
Based on a true story, details the daring 1964 theft of the J.P. Morgan jewel collection from New York’s American Museum of Natural History. Called the “Greatest Jewel Heist of the 20th Century,” the robbers took 22 precious gems, including the Star of India (a 563.35-carat sapphire), the 100.32-carat de Long Ruby and the 16.25-carat Eagle Diamond (which was never recovered) … stones so famous they would be impossible to sell.

Cast
Robert Conrad as Allan Kuhn
Don Stroud as Jack Murphy
Donna Mills as Ginny Eaton
Robyn Millan as Sharon Kagel
Luther Adler as Max The Eye
Paul Stewart as Avery
Morgan Paull as Arnie Holcomb
Ben Frank as Hopper Magee
Burt Young as Sgt. Bernasconi
Pepper Martin as Sgt. Terwilliger
Randee Lynne Jensen as Girl at party
Jess Barker as Museum Guard

References

External links

1975 films
1970s heist films
American heist films
Films directed by Marvin J. Chomsky
American International Pictures films
1970s English-language films
1970s American films